Thulasiyapattinam is a village in Nagapattinam District in the Indian state of Tamil Nadu. More than 250 families live in this village. The village forms the border of Nagapattinam district. The Valavanaru River is passing near the outskirts of the village. The village was once ruled by a king named Thulasi Raja, who gave the name of the town.

Nearest cities 

 Thiruthuraipoondi: It is 20 km from Thulasiyapattinam. The city has many shops for wholesale, four theatres, and single sex schools.
 Vedaranyam: Thulasiyapattinam is under taluk in Vedaranyam. It is 23 km from Thulasiyapattinam. It's a seashore area.
 Muthupet: Its largest area. It has a lagoon. It is 18 km from Thulasiyapattinam.

Villages in Nagapattinam district